Fangoria is an American magazine devoted to horror and exploitation films, which has a number of associated brands:
 Fangoria Comics
 Fangoria Films
 Fangoria Radio

Fangoria may also refer to:
 Fangoria (band), a Spanish electro pop band

See also
Fangoria Blood Drive, short-form horror film contest
Fangoria's Weekend of Horrors